Speyside High School may refer to:

Speyside High School, Tobago, twinned with Hornsey Secondary School for Girls; see List of schools in Trinidad and Tobago
Speyside High School, Aberlour, Moray, Scotland